Ertuğrul Yalçınbayır (born 1946) is a Turkish politician and lawyer who served as the Deputy Prime Minister in the cabinet of Prime Minister Abdullah Gül between 2002 and 2003 as a member of the Justice and Development Party (AKP). He left it before the 2007 general election.

He was first elected as a Member of Parliament from the Islamist Welfare Party in 1995 and was re-elected in 1999 from the Virtue Party and 2002 from the AKP. In the 1970s, he had worked for the Republican People's Party (CHP).

References

1946 births
Living people
Republican People's Party (Turkey) politicians
Members of the 22nd Parliament of Turkey
Members of the 21st Parliament of Turkey
Members of the 20th Parliament of Turkey
Istanbul University Faculty of Law alumni